The Ultimate Collection is a compilation album by Christian pop group Jump5, released on April 7, 2009.

Track listing

Disc one

Disc two

References 

Jump5 albums
2009 greatest hits albums
Sparrow Records compilation albums